The 2005 European Curling Championships were held in Garmisch-Partenkirchen, Germany from December 9 to 17.

Men's

A tournament

Final round robin standings

Tie breaker
December 15th, 20:00

Playoffs

Semifinals
December 16th, 16:00

Bronze-medal game
December 17th, 14:00

Gold-medal game
December 17th, 14:00

B tournament

Group A Final round robin standings

Group B Final round robin standings

Playoffs

Challenge series
(Best of Three. Winner gets a berth in the 2006 World Men's Curling Championship along with the top 7 A-tournament teams)

 7–2 
 10–5 
 6–5

Women's

A tournament

Final round robin standings

Tie breakers
December 15th, 12:00

December 15th, 20:00

Playoffs

Semifinals
December 16th, 12:00

Bronze-medal game
December 17th, 9:00

Gold-medal game
December 17th, 9:00

B tournament

Group A Final round robin standings

Group B Final round robin standings

Playoffs

Challenge series
(Best of Three. Winner gets a berth in the 2006 Ford World Women's Curling Championship along with the top 7 A-tournament teams)

 6–5 
 8–2

References

European Curling Championships
European Curling Championships
International curling competitions hosted by Germany
2005 in German sport
2005 in European sport
December 2005 sports events in Europe
Sport in Garmisch-Partenkirchen